Himanthalia is a genus of brown algae. It is the only genus in the family Himanthaliaceae in the order Fucales. It includes two species: Himanthalia durvillei and Himanthalia elongata.

References

Fucales
Fucales genera